OpenTide Korea (Ko: 오픈타이드 코리아) was a South Korean information technology and consulting corporation. It was a subsidiary of Samsung SDS and an affiliate of the Samsung group. OpenTide Korea was founded in 2000 by Lee Jae-yong who is the vice chairman of Samsung Electronics and the son of Lee Kun-hee, Chairman of Samsung.

OpenTide Korea merged into MIRACOM Inc Co., Ltd in December 1, 2015.

See also 
 Samsung Electronics#Viral marketing for the OpenTide (Taiwan) controversy

References

External links 
  

Samsung subsidiaries